AdventureQuest (also referred to by its website name BattleOn or abbreviated to AQ) is an online Flash-based single-player role-playing video game started in 2002 and currently developed by Artix Entertainment. As of March 5, 2019, aq.battleon.com, the game's hosting website, and www.battleon.com, the game's homepage, have an Alexa rating of 54,521.

A one-time "guardianship" fee was introduced in 2003, allowing the player to access extended in-game content. Ownership of the game transferred to the newly formed Artix Entertainment in 2004, and a server population cap was added for non-Guardian players in May of that year. In 2005, a microtransaction system was put into place. In response to criticism that server restrictions made logging on for non-paying players difficult, in October 2006 Artix Entertainment introduced a server in which a player could log on at any time, but with a tight level limit. On July 14, 2010, the server cap was removed permanently.

Gameplay
AdventureQuest is a single-player RPG, although character data is stored on AE servers. The gameplay is similar to that of traditional RPGs in that it revolves around fighting monsters in a turn-based system. As players defeat monsters, they gain experience points, gold, and occasionally "Z-Tokens", a secondary currency that can also be bought with real-world money. There are also special items or sets called Mastercrafts (MC for short), which are 5% stronger than normal items but cost 10% more gold/tokens.

Skill points, like mana, are used for certain class abilities. They are also used for some armor skills, as an upkeep cost for most misc items, and the usage of potions. Skill points are required to flee from battle; the higher the monster's level, the more SP is needed.

AdventureQuest has an alignment system similar to that of Dungeons & Dragons, which includes selection between Good and Evil as well as Unity and Chaos. Actions taken in game affect the player's alignment, and give the player a selection of custom rewards and access to in-game events. The game also includes equipment that will bestow special effects depending on the player's alignment.

Combat mechanics
Most fights begin through random encounters and quests, which can be found throughout the game. The battle system is turn-based; on player's turn, they may attack, equip an item (such as a weapon, shield, or armor), use other miscellaneous items, cast a spell, perform a skill (if players are equipped with an item that has a skill), call a pet/guest, or flee from the battle (if the player has enough skill points). Both characters and monsters have elemental and weapon-based resistances and weaknesses. Elements include fire, ice, water, energy, earth, wind, light, and darkness. There are three categories of attacks, and each weapon, spell, or skill belongs to a category: melee, ranged, or magic. There are six trainable stats (Strength, Dexterity, Intellect, Endurance, Charisma, and Luck). Strength/STR affects the amount of damage inflicted and taken if a melee/ranged attack is being used, as well as accuracy for melee attacks, Dexterity/DEX affects the amount of damage done or taken if a ranged attack is being used (but affects ranged damage less than STR does and it also increases dodge ability as well as accuracy). Intellect affects magic damage (and increases mana points) while also increasing the accuracy of magic weapons/skills and spells, endurance increases hit points, charisma affects damage being done by pets and guests, as well as their accuracy, and luck gives players small bonuses to accuracy and dodge chance for all attacks (it also increases the player's chance of attacking first in battle, and lets them perform a Lucky Strike 10% of the time if they have LUK, which boosts their damage). A battle ends once the enemy's HP drops to zero or if the player's HP drops to zero.

Like most other RPGs, AdventureQuest has special releases or events as well as a limited time shop based on real-life holidays. Holidays include: Snugglefest (Valentine's Day), the Blarney War (St. Patrick's Day), April Fools, Mogloween (Halloween), and Frostval (Christmas). Adventure Quest also includes anniversary events such as The Dragon of Time, Curse of the Phantom Pixel, and Rise of the Shadow Council.

Clans

In AdventureQuest, players can participate in competitive activities through the clan system. There are eight clans available for players to join, representing the eight elemental realms. Clan bases contain a shop that sells items of its respective element, as well as clan-unique items.

In addition to the in-game leaders of these clans, there are player leaders who are elected on the BattleOn Forums. These players ensure activity and stability for their respective clans and also play larger parts during clan-based game releases.

Houses 
Houses may be purchased with Z-Tokens. Furthermore, players may also use these Z-tokens to buy pictures and guards to decorate and protect their houses. When a player visits another player's house, they must battle the owner's guards - if any - in order to gain access to that house. Some buildings yield resources, such as health and mana potions, in varying amounts, depending on the quality of the house in question.

Payment

Guardianship

Guardianship, which can be purchased for a one-time fee of $19.95, gives players access to premium content. This fee goes toward the maintenance of the game and its servers. Guardians can reach a maximum level of 150 while adventurers can reach a maximum level of 135. It also boosts the player's Z-Token count by 1000.  Players can also go to more locations in the game that adventurers can't, such as the Guardian Tower. Furthermore, guardians can unlock quests and items that are not for adventurers. Other exclusives include the ability to create an account for ArchKnight and ZardWars, which are similar side-games that are also developed by Artix Entertainment. Furthermore, players can upgrade to another form of membership known as the X-Guardian, which gives even more in-game advantages, such as faster XP gain.

Z-Tokens 

Introduced in June 2006, Money or Z-Tokens are rare coins in AdventureQuest that are occasionally found after winning a battle. Players may also purchase Z-Tokens with real-world money. Players may use Z-Tokens to buy shields, armor, weapons, pets, and items. These Z-Token-bought combat items tend to be more powerful than normal items of the same level, and can be purchased at a relatively lower player level. Players may also purchase inventory slots with Z-Tokens, or trade them for in-game gold. A special shop called the Limited Time Shop offers mostly Z-Token equipment, usually either discounted or soon-to-be rare.

Critical reception
A common criticism of AdventureQuest is that there is little to no player interaction with other players in the game. OMGN praised the graphics theme and the broad range of quests, events, stories, equipment and monsters. The battle system was considered easy to learn, but held "nothing to get excited about."

See also
 AdventureQuest Worlds (MMORPG)
 DragonFable
 MechQuest
 WarpForce

References

External links
 

2002 video games
Artix Entertainment
Flash games
Free-to-play video games
Role-playing video games
Single-player online games
Browser games
Video games developed in the United States